Naiacus is a genus of mites in the family Acaridae.

Species
 Naiacus muertensis H.H.J. Nesbitt, 1990

References

Acaridae